The mountain chickadee (Poecile gambeli) is a small songbird, a passerine bird in the tit family Paridae.

Taxonomy 
The specific name honors naturalist William Gambel. The mountain chickadee was formerly placed in the genus Parus with most other tits, but mtDNA cytochrome b sequence data and morphology suggest that separating Poecile more adequately expresses these birds' relationships. Molecular phylogenetic studies have shown that the mountain chickadee is sister to the black-capped chickadee (Poecile atricapillus).

Description 
Adults of both sexes have a black cap joining a black postocular stripe behind distinctive white eyebrows. Their backs and flanks are gray and they have paler gray underparts; they have a short black bill, and a black bib. The Mountain Chickadee is one of 55 species of Chickadees and Tits. The mountain chickadee can be distinguished from other North American chickadees because mountain chickadees are marked with a white line through the side of their black cap, whereas all other North American chickadees have a solid black-cap. Another difference between the mountain chickadee and the 55 other species of chickadees is their location, range, and habitat.

Distribution and habitat 
Common inhabitants of the mountainous regions of the western United States, their range extends from the southern Yukon to California and Rocky Mountain States in the United States. A few mountain chickadees may migrate locally up the mountains in the summer and down into the mountain foothills in the winter; but this phenomenon is not well documented.

Breeding 
They breed monogamously, producing 1 to 2 broods per year. In each brood, the average clutch size is 5 to 9 eggs. The eggs are white, but are speckled with a terracotta color. Occasionally, the Mountain Chickadee will lay an egg without any terracotta color. Incubation by the female is 14 days. The young are altricial, and stay in the nest for 21 days while being fed by both parents.

Nesting 
Mountain Chickadees build their nests in cavities. It is common to find nests of Mountain Chickadees in wood, but since they cannot burrow into wood that is not softened, they also build their nests into pockets that are either naturally occurring or previously made by another species. Inside of the nest, the female Mountain Chickadee builds a seal for the entry from resources she gathers, such as fur. This functions as protection for her newly laid eggs when she leaves the nest. She also may use these resources to build insulation for her nest if the crevice is large. The average depth for a Mountain Chickadee nest falls between 13 to 27 centimeters. Mountain chickadees also may use a nest for multiple years. Mountain chickadee populations are often limited to certain locations which have good nesting sites and many cavities for inhabiting.

Diet 
Their primary diet is insects during the summer and breeding season; conifer seeds and other plant seeds are taken throughout the year. They cling to the undersides of branches and to tree trunks, searching for food in the bark or breaking seeds open by hammering them with their beaks. Mountain chickadees also eat a wide variety of insects. These insects include caterpillars, beetles, insect eggs, pupae, and spiders. They spend most of their daylight hours scavenging for food and feeding. Their diet is best categorized as omnivorous, with only 30 percent of their food being plants and the rest insects. Due to their insect-rich diet, Mountain Chickadees help to manage and control insect populations.

Vocalization 
Their call is a throaty chick-adee-dee-dee, while their song is a 3- or 4-note descending whistle fee-bee-bay or fee-bee-fee-bee. Their song sounds like it is whistling the word "Cheeseburger".
They travel in pairs or small groups, and may join multi-species feeding flocks after breeding season. When mountain chickadees are choosing a male to mate with, they tend to mate with the more dominant male. Males with a loud call and a large body tend to be chosen by females over quieter and smaller males. This makes the mountain chickadee’s callings and songs a very important factor in their reproduction.

Behavior 
The mountain chickadee’s behavior is pretty similar to other chickadee species. They are fast and agile birds that hop through twigs while looking for insects and seeds. When summer is coming to an end, the mountain chickadees group together with a couple adult birds and some young birds in each grouping. The young birds usually spend the summer on their own, but as winter comes around they meet up with the older birds. Recent studies have indicated that in mixed flocks, black-capped chickadees become dominant over mountain chickadees. They are also very active birds. They can be found grasping to small twigs, and often hang upside down.

Gallery

References

External links

 Mountain chickadee - Poecile gambeli - USGS Patuxent Bird Identification InfoCenter
 Mountain chickadee Species Account - Cornell Lab of Ornithology
 
 
 
 
 
 

mountain chickadee
Native birds of Western Canada
Native birds of the Western United States
Native birds of the Rocky Mountains
Birds of the Sierra Nevada (United States)
mountain chickadee
Taxa named by Robert Ridgway